Edwin Maurice Outwater (born 12 April 1971) is an American conductor from Santa Monica, California.

About 
From September 2007 until 2017, he served as the music director of the Kitchener-Waterloo Symphony in Ontario, Canada.

From 2001 to 2006, Outwater was resident conductor of the San Francisco Symphony.

Before that, from 2001 to 2005, he was the Wattis Foundation music director of the San Francisco Symphony Youth Orchestra, where he led the orchestra in all of their concerts as well as on tour to Europe in the summer of 2004. During the tour, the orchestra made its debut at Vienna's Musikverein and the Théâtre des Champs-Élysées in Paris, and returned to Amsterdam's Concertgebouw.

Earlier in his professional career, Outwater had served as resident conductor and associate guest conductor of the Florida Philharmonic, associate conductor of the Festival-Institute at Round Top (a teaching program), principal conductor of the Adriatic Chamber Music Festival in Molise, Italy, and assistant conductor of the Tulsa Philharmonic.

In September 2019, he conducted the San Francisco Symphony Orchestra with Metallica for the S&M2 shows and live album to open the new Chase Centre.

In the two YouTube Symphony Orchestra concerts, which Michael Tilson Thomas conducted, Outwater participated as associate conductor in preparing the orchestra.

In 2020 he collaborated with guitarist Kirk Hammett on his solo debut "Portals" released in 2022, co-writing the songs "High Plains Drifter" and "The Incantation" as well as playing keyboards and conducting the orchestral arrangements.

Community outreach
In 2004, Outwater's his education programs received the Leonard Bernstein award for excellence in educational programming, and his Chinese New Year program won the MetLife award for community outreach.

At the San Francisco Symphony, Outwater conducted family concerts that were heard by more than 25,000 students from San Francisco schools each year. A separate children's concert series served students throughout Northern California.

In Florida, Outwater designed the Florida Philharmonic Family Series and its Music for Youth program, which was heard annually by more than 40,000 fifth-grade students in South Florida. He appears frequently with youth orchestras throughout the United States. He has served as music director of the Santa Barbara Youth Symphony, and has been on the music faculties of the University of Tulsa, Idyllwild Arts Academy, and University of California, Santa Barbara.

Education
Outwater attended Harvard University, graduating cum laude in 1993 with a degree in English literature. While at Harvard, he was music director of the Bach Society Orchestra and wrote the music for the 145th annual production of the Hasty Pudding Theatricals. He received his master's degree in conducting from UC Santa Barbara, where he studied with Heiichiro Ohyama and Paul Polivnick.

References

External links
www.edwinoutwater.com

1971 births
Living people
American male conductors (music)
Harvard University alumni
University of California, Santa Barbara alumni
American music educators
Musicians from Santa Monica, California
Classical musicians from California
21st-century American conductors (music)
21st-century American male musicians